Chey Saen District is a district located in Preah Vihear Province, in northern Cambodia. According to the 1998 census of Cambodia, it had a population of 15,004. The population recorded by the 2008 census was 20,730.

Administration
As of 2020, the district contains the following khums (communes).

References

Districts of Preah Vihear province